The Divisiones Regionales de Fútbol in the Canary Islands are ultimately overseen by the Federación Canaria de Fútbol which operates Group 12 of the Tercera División RFEF, the fifth tier of the Spanish football league system, divided among each of the country's autonomous regions. However, unlike most of the regions, the leagues in the sixth tier and below are organised by two separate federations, corresponding to the provinces of Las Palmas and Tenerife. The other region with this arrangement is the Basque Country which has three provincial forks to its amateur setup; Andalusia and the Balearic Islands have two and three parallel divisions respectively under the same umbrella. Pipi POPO

League setup summary
Interinsular Preferente de Las Palmas (Level 6 of the Spanish football pyramid)
Interinsular Preferente de Tenerife (Level 6)
Primera Regional Aficionado Gran Canaria (Level 7)
Primera Regional Aficionado Fuerteventura (Level 7)
Primera Regional Aficionado Lanzarote (Level 7)
Primera Interinsular Tenerife (Level 7)
Primera Insular La Palma (Level 7)
Segunda Regional Aficionado Gran Canaria (Level 8)
Segunda Interinsular Tenerife (Level 8)
Segunda Insular-El Hierro (Level 8)
Segunda Insular-La Gomera (Level 8)

League chronology
Timeline - Las Palmas

Timeline - Tenerife

Interinsular Preferente de Las Palmas
Preferente de las Islas Canarias is the sixth level of competition of the Spanish Football League in that community. 

The league consists of two provincial groups (Tenerife and Gran Canaria) of 18 teams. At the end of the season, the champion of each group is promoted directly to Group XII of the Tercera División RFEF and the runners-up play a playoff for promotion. The last four teams in the Gran Canaria group and last three in the Tenerife group are relegated to Primera Categoría.

Interinsular Preferente de Las Palmas

2012–13 teams

Regional football in Tenerife

6th tier: Interinsular Preferente de Tenerife
The Interinsular Preferente de Tenerife is the top tier of Tenerife football, with two leagues, the Primera Interinsular Tenerife and Segunda Interinsular Tenerife sitting below it. Clubs that achieve promotion from the Tenerife Preferente go to the Canarian Islands group of the Tercera Division RFEF.

2021-22 teams

Group 1

Group 2

Group 3

7th tier: Primera Interinsular de Tenerife
Primera Interinsular de Tenerife is the seventh level of competition in Tenerife. The league is played with 36 teams in two groups of 18. At the end of the season, the champions playoff for direct promotion.  The loser enters the promotion playoff with the runners-up, 3rd and 4th placed teams for an addition promotion. Three clubs from each group are relegated to Segunda Categoría Insular.

8th tier: Segunda Interinsular de Tenerife
Segunda Interinsular de Tenerife is the eighth level of competition in Tenerife. The league is played with 38 teams in one group of 20 and another group of 18. At the end of the season, the champions are promoted. Runners-up, 3rd, 4th and 5th placed teams enter promotion playoff for two additional promotions.

Primera de Aficionados de Gran Canaria
Primera de Aficionados de Gran Canaria is the seventh level of competition in Gran Canaria. The league is played with 36 teams in two groups of 18. At the end of the season, the champions are promoted and the runners-up and 3rd placed teams advance to promotion playoff for two additional promotions. Four clubs from each group are relegated to Segunda Categoría Insular.

Some teams playing at this level
Castillo

Liga Insular de Aficionados Fuerteventura
Liga Insular de Aficionados Fuerteventura is the seventh level of competition in Fuerteventura. The league is played with 16 teams. At the end of the season, the champion advances to promotion playoff.

Primera Insular Aficionado Lanzarote
Primera Insular Aficionado Lanzarote is the seventh level of competition in Lanzarote. The league is played with 10 teams with the champion advancing to the promotion playoff at the end of the season.

Segunda Regional de Gran Canaria
Segunda Regional de Gran Canaria is the seventh level of competition in Gran Canaria. The league is played with 43 teams in 3 groups of 13-16. At the end of the season, the champions, runners-up, the 3rd placed team from group 1 and the best 3rd placed team between the other two groups are promoted.

Primera Insular La Palma
Primera Insular La Palma is the seventh level of competition in La Palma. The league is played with 10 teams with the top four clubs advancing to promotion league. The winner is promoted.

External links
Futbolme.com
Federación Tinerfeña de Fútbol
Federación Interinsular de Fútbol de Las Palmas

Divisiones Regionales de Fútbol
Football in the Canary Islands